Yeshiva Ketana may refer to:

 Cheder or Talmud Torah, an Orthodox Jewish elementary school
 Mesivta, an Orthodox Jewish secondary school

See also 

Jewish day school
Yeshiva gedola